Clear Sky Radio was a Canadian broadcasting company that owned radio stations in Alberta and British Columbia. The company, headquartered in Lethbridge, Alberta, was incorporated in 2006 after it was granted its first radio license.

In January 2018, Clear Sky sold CJCY-FM in Medicine Hat to Rogers Media, and the yet-to-have-launched CKOV-FM in Strathmore to Golden West Broadcasting (with Clear Sky's co-owners Paul Larsen and Mary McKinnon Mills holding a minority stake). In December 2018, it was announced that Vista Radio would purchase the remaining Clear Sky Radio stations.

Stations

Alberta
 Lethbridge - CKBD-FM, CJOC-FM
 Medicine Hat - CJCY-FM
 Strathmore - CKOV-FM

British Columbia
Cranbrook - CFSM-FM

References

External links

Radio broadcasting companies of Canada
Companies based in Lethbridge
Mass media companies established in 2006
Privately held companies of Canada
2006 establishments in Alberta
Mass media companies disestablished in 2018
2018 disestablishments in Alberta
Defunct Canadian radio networks
2018 mergers and acquisitions